Bahçecik (literally "little garden") is a Turkish place name that may refer to the following places in Turkey:

 Bahçecik, Bilecik, a town in Bilecik Province
 Bahçecik, Feke, a village in the district of Feke, Adana Province
 Bahçecik, Haymana, a village in the district of Haymana, Ankara Province
 Bahçecik, İscehisar, a village in the district of İscehisar, Afyonkarahisar Province
 Bahçecik, Karakoçan
 Bahçecik, Kocaeli (formerly Bardizag), a village near İzmit
 Bahçecik, Merzifon, a village in the district of Merzifon, Amasya Province
 Bahçecik, Oltu
 Bahçecik, Ulus, a village in the district of Ulus, Bartın Province
 Bahçecik, Sur, a village in the district of Sur, Diyarbakır Province